The Michael G. Foster School of Business at the University of Washington (also known as UW Foster) is the business school of the University of Washington in Seattle. Founded in 1917 as the University of Washington School of Business Administration, the school was the second business school in the western United States. 

Accredited by the Association to Advance Collegiate Schools of Business, the school offers bachelor's, master's, and doctoral degrees, as well as a undergraduate minor and certificate programs. Enrollment each year is about 2,500 students in its undergraduate and graduate programs and more than 1,000 working professionals in its executive education seminars and lifelong learning programs.

History
Founded in 1917, the University of Washington School of Business Administration was the second business school in the western United States.

In 1981, American businesswoman and University of Washington alumna Nancy Jacob became the ninth dean of the School of Business Administration, making her the first woman to lead a major American business school.

On September 7, 2007, the University of Washington announced that the Business School would be renamed for Michael G. Foster, a UW Business School 1928 graduate who has pledged a total of $50 million in gifts. Michael G. Foster founded Foster & Marshall, which was the first locally-owned brokerage in Seattle with a seat on the New York Stock Exchange.

Academics

At the undergraduate level, Foster offers a Bachelor of Arts in Business Administration (BABA) degree, with 7 formal options of study: accounting, entrepreneurship, finance, human resources management, information systems, marketing, and operations & supply chain management. Students pursue a common curriculum in the lower division and upper division core courses, then specialize in their area of focus. Foster undergraduates can also earn a Certificate of International Studies in Business (CISB) or participate in the Foster Honors Program. Meanwhile, entrepreneurship and business minors are available for non-business UW students. Non-business UW Students may also earn a Sales Certificate or participate in the Lavin Entrepreneurship Program.

At the graduate level, the University of Washington Foster School offers a full-time Master of Business Administration (MBA) program, Global Executive MBA program, Evening MBA, Executive MBA, Hybrid MBA (online program), Technology Management MBA, and a doctoral program. The school also offers one-year master's programs in entrepreneurship, accounting, information systems, and supply chain management. For the 2015-2016 academic year, there are total of 102 full-time faculty with 44 endowed chairs, professorships, and research fellowships. The Financial Times ranked the Foster School 24th in the world for research in 2014 and 2015.

Foster School of Business also has a PhD Program in Business Administration, a full-time and year-round research-based program.

Admissions
Admission into the Foster School of Business is highly competitive. At the undergraduate level, the majority of students are admitted through Standard Admission. Through Standard Admission, students first matriculate to the University of Washington as pre-major students, then apply to Foster after completing certain prerequisite courses, prior to their sophomore or junior year.

A small number of students are admitted through the Freshman Direct program, directly out of high school. These students are selected from the pool of students admitted into the University of Washington, and exhibit "exceptionally competitive academic records". In 2018, admitted Freshman Direct students had an average high school unweighted GPA of 3.91 (on a 4.0 scale).

Rankings

The Foster School of Business MBA program is ranked 30th in the nation by Bloomberg, 22nd by US News and 8th by Financial Times for "Top MBAs for Women." The Financial Times B-School rankings 2017 ranks the Foster School of Business at #41 in the world. An objective ranking of Faculty Scholarly Productivity Index by Academic Analytics ranks University of Washington #1 in research productivity in Business Administration and #8 in marketing.  U.S. News & World Report ranked Foster's Evening MBA program 8th among public universities in 2014.

U.S. News ranks Foster's undergraduate program #19 nationwide on their list of Best Undergraduate Business Programs, out of 504 U.S. schools, and #9 among public universities.

Campus

The University of Washington Foster School of Business campus comprises six buildings, five in Seattle, Washington, and one in Kirkland, Washington. 
 Founders Hall will be opening in June 2022 and is being funded entirely by private gifts from leadership donors. The building will house classrooms, student team rooms, space for student programs, career services, and experiential learning centers. It will be one of the greenest buildings on the University of Washington campus, designed to achieve a 79% reduction in energy consumption over the next 60 years.
 PACCAR Hall is one of two new buildings that serve as headquarters for the Foster School. It contains faculty offices, classrooms, a cafe and commons. The Foster Business Library is accessible from PACCAR.
 Dempsey Hall, named for Neal Dempsey, general partner with Bay Partners and lifelong supporter of the University of Washington. Dempsey Hall opened in fall 2012. 
 Mackenzie Hall, named in memory of Donald Mackenzie, Chair of the Department of Accounting from 1949 to 1955. Mackenzie is home to the offices of the Foster School's Consulting & Business Development Center, the Global Business Center, the Center for Leadership and Strategic Thinking, as well as the Foster School Advancement and Alumni teams. In August 2020, demolition of Mackenzie Hall began to make way for Founders Hall.
 Bank of America Executive Education Center houses the offices, classrooms, and lounge spaces for the Executive Education and Executive MBA programs for the Foster School of Business.
 Eastside Executive Center is located in Kirkland, Washington, and houses offices and classrooms, and collaborative study spaces for the Technology Management MBA Program.

Centers and Programs

The following centers and specialty programs are part of the UW Foster School of Business.

 Arthur W. Buerk Center for Entrepreneurship. The University of Washington supports Seattle and the Pacific Northwest, one of the primary venture capital and entrepreneur communities in the West Coast, United States. The Buerk Center for Entrepreneurship connects students, faculty and business community members together and serves as resource for start-ups and companies.
 Center for Leadership and Strategic Thinking. The Center for Leadership and Strategic Thinking (CSLT) examines methods and effectiveness of leadership in various industries including health care, defense, and aviation. Center research employs simulations and game theory as new approaches to teaching business management
 Center for Sales and Marketing Strategy. The Center for Sales and Marketing Strategy aligns important sales and marketing problems with academic research and analysis techniques to develop strategies that improve business performance, and facilitate business-academic collaboration to create and disseminate sales and marketing knowledge.
 Consulting and Business Development Center. The Consulting and Business Development Center provides students with consulting experience, pairing student teams with growing businesses in economically distressed and under-represented minority communities. 
 Global Business Center. The UW Global Business Center works in partnership with the United States Department of Education to contribute to the international competitiveness of American business by developing and supporting international business programs for students, faculty, and the business community.
 Certificate in International Studies in Business. Created in 1992 with support from the Center for International Business, Education and Research, the Certificate of International Studies in Business at the University of Washington enables undergraduate business students to gain knowledge of international issues and global business practices.
The Product Management Center. The Product Management Center
USTC-UW Institute for Global Business and Finance Innovation. The University of Science and Technology of China-UW Institute for Global Business and Finance Innovation fosters collaborative research, promotes student exchange, and supports international education and training through a partnership between the School of Management at the University of Science and Technology of China and the University of Washington Michael G. Foster School of Business.
Foster Customer Analytics Center. The Foster Customer Analytics Center develops and fosters relationships between businesses, researchers, and students in the fields of machine learning and marketing analytics. 
Creative Destruction Lab.

Student Life/Foster Community

UW students can join over 1,000 registered student organizations. Some registered student organizations include: 
 Out in Business, a student organization that positions Foster MBA students to be "leaders of LGBTQ+ inclusion" in business. 
 Global Business Association, a student organization that enhances Foster MBA candidates’ understanding of cross-border and cross-cultural business issues that permeate the modern business environment.
 Business Ethics Association, a student organization that spotlights the importance of ethical business practices.
 Business Impact Group UW, a student organization that works with the UW’s Consulting & Business Development Center to develop tactical strategies for small business. 
 Asian Business Student Association.
 Diversity in Business, a student organization in the Foster MBA program. 
 Alpha Kappa Psi Business Fraternity, a student organization for those who have an interest in business to be provided with opportunities to learn and grow through professional development, philanthropy, and social events.
 Association of Black Business Students, a student organization that recruits, assists, and organizes to promote the interest and success of students from underrepresented communities majoring in or interested in business.

Achievements
Some achievements of the University of Washington Business School:
 UW Foster School of Business has the 2nd most productive management research faculty in North America, according to a joint study out of Texas A&M University and the University of Florida.
 UW Team won the Leeds 2011 Net Impact Case Competition, the nation’s premier case competition built around businesses facing sustainability challenges.
 University of Washington Foster School of Business PhD Program in Accounting ranks among the top five in the world in a study conducted by Brigham Young University and Utah State University.

Publication
 Foster Business. Business magazine reports on the news from the UW business school.
 Journal of Financial and Quantitative Analysis. It highlights theoretical and empirical research in financial economics.
 Seattle Growth podcast is led by UW Foster professor, Jeff Shulman, and discusses the thoughts of residents, businesses, and city leaders about what Seattle’s economic and population growth means to them.
 Conversations on Careers and Professional Life, hosted by Senior Associate Director of MBA Career Management, Gregory Heller, this podcast goes into conversations with UW and UW Foster faculty, staff, alumni, executives, current MBA candidates and other experts relating to career development, planning, and resilience. 
 Frank Discussions, a series of brief executive interviews hosted by UW Foster Dean Frank Hodge.
 UW Foster Blog, reports on the news of the UW Foster business school

Notable alumni
Arts and Entertainment

 Kenny G, American smooth jazz saxophonist
 Chika Yoshida, Japanese YouTuber

Athletics

 Jim Beattie, former pitcher for the New York Yankees and Seattle Mariners
 Fred Beckey, American rock climber and mountaineer
 Paige Mackenzie, professional golfer
 Edgar Martínez, former Seattle Mariner and MLB Hall of Famer 
 Robert Moch, American rower in the 1936 Olympics
 Courtney Thompson, former volleyball player, former member of the United States women’s national volleyball team
 Marques Tuiasosopo, retired quarterback for the Oakland Raiders

Banking/Financial

 David Bonderman, founding partner of TPG
 Yoshihiko Miyauchi, chairman and CEO of Japanese financial services group ORIX Corp
 Ronald "Ron" Oliveira, CEO of Revolut USA
 Richard Roll (MBA 1963), American economist, best known for his work on portfolio theory and asset pricing

Beauty/Fashion

 Michelle Gass, CEO and Director of Kohl’s
 Bruce Nordstrom, former chairman and CEO of Nordstrom
 Annie Young-Scrivner, CEO of Wella

Education

 Hean Tat Keh (PhD 1998), Professor of Marketing and Director of Research at Monash University

Food

 Marcus Charles, restaurateur and entrepreneur
 Fran Bigelow, founder of Fran’s Chocolates
 Ivar Haglund, founder of Ivar’s
 Orin C. Smith, former president and CEO of Starbucks Corporation

Government and Judiciary

 Andrew Brimmer, the first African American to serve as governor of the Federal Reserve System
 Suzan DelBene, American politician and businesswoman
 Tobias Read (MBA 2003), Oregon State Treasurer and former businessman

Gaming

 Robert Khoo, President of Penny Arcade
 Peter Adkison, game designer and founder of Wizards of the Coast

Healthcare

 Ivan Liachko, Founder and CEO of Phase Genomics

Real Estate

 Donald Bren, Chairman of the Irvine Company

Travel

 William S. Ayer, president and CEO of Alaska Airlines
 Stanley McDonald, founder of Princess Cruises
 Brad Tilden, CEO of the Alaska Air Group

See also
List of United States business school rankings
List of business schools in the United States
MBA

References

External links
 Interview with Erin Ernst - Foster MBA Admissions Director

Colleges, schools, and departments of the University of Washington
Business schools in Washington (state)
Educational institutions established in 1917
1917 establishments in Washington (state)